During the Great Patriotic War of 1941–1945, a Soviet partisan united formation (1941–1944) ( united formation), also called a military-operational group or a centre, became one of the organisational forms which grouped together various Soviet partisan units. A united formation linked several of the smaller partisan units - partisan brigades or regiments or detachments - with a view to conducting wide-scale and center-coordinated military operations in the rear of occupying  Axis forces.

On the territory of the  BSSR about 40 such units developed in the period 1941 to 1944, mostly in 1943.

The higher-level Soviet ruling bodies - the Headquarters of the Partisan Movement, the Belarusian Headquarters of the Partisan Movement, and underground  Province, Inter-District and  District Committees of the  Communist Party - organised units of this kind. Usually, local Communist  leaders or higher Red Army officers took command, and the staffs of the respective united formations carried out management functions.

Notes

Sources
 А.Л. Манаенкаў. Партызанскае злучэнне ў Вялікую Айчынную вайну // Беларуская энцыклапедыя: У 18 т. Т. 12. — Мінск: БелЭн, 2001. — 560 с. pp. 113–114.  (т.12). The source x references: Беларусь у Вялікай Айчыннай вайне 1941—1945: Энцыкл. Мн., 1990. С. 398.

Soviet partisans